Hybrid Sanskrit may refer to 
Buddhist Hybrid Sanskrit (BHS)
Epigraphical Hybrid Sanskrit (EHS)

See also
Sanskrit